Myridian are a melodic death metal band from Melbourne, Australia. Formed in 2009, the currently line-up consists of Felix Lane (vocals/bass), Jeremy Landry (guitars), Ian Mather (guitars), Sarah Lim (keyboards/vocals) and Zebådee Scott (drums). To date, Myridian has released two EPs and three full length studio albums, the most recent being Starless released in 2022.

History

Formation and early history

Formed in 2009, Myridian released A Starless Demo, a three track EP, on 15 June 2011.

Members

Current members 

Felix Lane - Vocals/Bass 
Zebådee Scott - Drums
Ian Mather - Guitars
Jeremy Landry - Guitars
Sarah Lim - Keyboards

Past members 

Myles Thomson - Drums (2009)
Alex Hutchinson - Drums (2009-2013)
Scott Brierley - Guitars (2009-2017)
Josh Spivak	-	Guitars, Vocals (2009-2014)
Julian Wheeler	- Keyboards (2009-2015)
Tobia Zama	- Bass (2011)
Dan Liston - Keyboards (2015-2020)

Timeline

Discography 

A Starless Demo - EP (2011)
Under The Fading Light (2012)
We, The Forlorn (2015)
Light in the Abyss (2020)
Starless - EP (2022)

References 

Australian melodic death metal musical groups